Time Bomb is a 1994 Indian Kannada-language action thriller film directed by Joe Simon and written and produced by N. Utthamchand Jain. The film starred Vishnuvardhan, Tiger Prabhakar Devaraj, Shruthi and Sowmya Kulkarni in the leading roles. The film's music is scored by Hamsalekha whilst the cinematography is by Johny Lal.

The film released on 4 February 1994 to mixed response from critics and audience.

Cast

Soundtrack
The music of the film was composed and lyrics written by Hamsalekha. After release, the soundtrack was well received. Audio was released on Manoranjan Music label.

References

1994 films
1990s Kannada-language films
Indian action films
Indian crime drama films
Films scored by Hamsalekha